

Helmut Thumm (25 August 1895 – 13 July 1977) was a German general during World War II. After pulling Hitler Youth teenagers out of the front lines against orders from above, he was relieved of his command of the LXIV Army Corps on 20 January 1945. Thumm died in 1977 in Welzheim.

Awards
 Iron Cross (1914) 2nd Class (26 August 1915) &1st Class (3 July 1918)
 Clasp to the Iron Cross (1939) 2nd Class (3 June 1940) & 1st Class (13 June 1940)
 Knight's Cross of the Iron Cross with Oak Leaves
 Knight's Cross on 30 June 1941 as Oberstleutnant and commander of Infantry Regiment 56
 166th Oak Leaves on 23 December 1942 as Oberst and commander of Jäger Regiment 56

References

Citations

Bibliography

 
 

1895 births
1977 deaths
German Army generals of World War II
Generals of Infantry (Wehrmacht)
German Army personnel of World War I
Recipients of the clasp to the Iron Cross, 1st class
Recipients of the Knight's Cross of the Iron Cross with Oak Leaves
People from the Kingdom of Württemberg
Reichswehr personnel
People from Ravensburg
Military personnel from Baden-Württemberg